Erzurumspor Futbol Kulübü, is a Turkish professional football club located in Erzurum who plays in the Süper Lig, the top tier of Turkish football.

Founded in 2005, the colours of club are blue and white. The club started to play football competitions in 2010 at amateur level. Achieving consecutive promotions between 2016 and 2018, the club earned to compete at Süper Lig at 2018–19 season.

History
The club has been founded as Erzurum Büyüşehir Belediyespor in 2005. In their inaugural season, club competed at Regional Amateur League and won Group 1 of 2010–11 Turkish Regional Amateur League with 49 points.

Between 2011 and 2016, they played at TFF Third League for 5 consecutive seasons. The club was renamed as Büyükşehir Belediye Erzurumspor in 2014. Club won 2015–16 TFF Third League, collecting 74 points in 36 games, 6 points adrift above Kızılcabölükspor. Promoted to TFF Second League, they competed Group White of 2016–17 season and finished regular season on 3th spot with 61 points.  Eliminating Kocaeli Birlikspor, Amed S.K. and Gümüşhanespor respectively at play-offs, they promoted to TFF First League for 2017–18 season.

In 2017–18 season, club eliminated Gazişehir Gaziantep F.K. after the 5–4 final score in play-off final after penalty shoot-outs and promoted to Süper Lig for the first time. They played their first Süper Lig game against Konyaspor on 12 August 2018 at Konya Büyükşehir Stadium where they lost 2–3. Their first goal at Süper Lig level was scored by French defender Leo Schwechlen against Konyaspor. The club could not avoid relegation in their first season at Süper Lig and relegated after sitting at 17th position after 34 weeks, collecting 35 points.

Following season, collected 62 points and achieved the second spot at TFF First League and the club promoted directly Süper Lig together with champion Hatayspor. The club has established their football academy in August 2020.

The club sacked coach Mesut Bakkal after the 1–3 loss against Antalyaspor at week 31 encounter of 2020–21 season, on 21 March 2021. Although the club announced their agreement with İsmail Kartal on 23 March 2021, Kartal resigned his job just 5 days after the employment, during the midseason training camp in Antalya, grounding his reason as "having neither energy, nor motvation", on March 28. The club announced their agreement with Yılmaz Vural, on 29 March 2021.

Stadium

Since its foundation, Erzurumspor FK plays their home games at Kazım Karabekir Stadium. Opened in 1968, the stadium was known respectively as Cemal Gürsel Stadium, commemorating after Cemal Gürsel, 4th president of Turkey until 2011, then Yeni Erzurum Stadium until 2012 and Kazim Karabekir Stadium since 2012.

Honours
 TFF First League
 Play-off Winner: 2017–18
 TFF Second League 
 Play-off Winner: 2016–17
 TFF Third League 
 Winner: 2015–16
 Turkish Regional Amateur League 
 Winner: 2010–11

League affiliations
 Süper Lig: 2018–19, 2020–21
 TFF First League: 2017–18, 2019–20, 2021–
 TFF Second League: 2016–17
 TFF Third League: 2011–16
 Turkish Regional Amateur League: 2010–11
 Amateur Leagues: 1967-10

Team statistics

Recent seasons

Players

Current squad

Out on loan

Coaching staff
As of 9 April 2021

Coacing history

Presidential history

References

External links

Official website
Erzurumspor F.K. on TFF.org

 
Football clubs in Turkey
Association football clubs established in 2005
2005 establishments in Turkey
Sport in Erzurum
Süper Lig clubs